Neni was an ancient Egyptian queen of the Thirteenth Dynasty. She was the wife of king Sobekhotep III and the mother of two of his daughters: Iuhetibu Fendy and Dedetanqet. The only title attested for Neni is king's wife, the regular title of queens of this period. Not much else is known about her. There is a stela set up by her steward attesting that Neni had her own estates.

References 

18th-century BC women
Queens consort of the Thirteenth Dynasty of Egypt